"I'll Do It All Over Again" is a song written by Bob McDill and Wayland Holyfield, and recorded by American country music artist Crystal Gayle.  It was released in March 1977 as the third single from the album Crystal.  The song reached number 2 on the Billboard Hot Country Singles & Tracks chart.

Charts

Weekly charts

Year-end charts

Covers
Later in 1977, Ava Barber released a cover of the song.

References

External links
 

1977 singles
1976 songs
Crystal Gayle songs
Songs written by Wayland Holyfield
Songs written by Bob McDill
Song recordings produced by Allen Reynolds
United Artists Records singles